This is a list of potentially habitable exoplanets. The list is mostly based on estimates of habitability by the Habitable Exoplanets Catalog (HEC), and data from the NASA Exoplanet Archive. The HEC is maintained by the Planetary Habitability Laboratory at the University of Puerto Rico at Arecibo. There is also a speculative list being developed of superhabitable planets.

Surface planetary habitability is thought to require orbiting at the right distance from the host star for liquid surface water to be present, in addition to various geophysical and geodynamical aspects, atmospheric density, radiation type and intensity, and the host star's plasma environment.

List 

This is a list of exoplanets within the circumstellar habitable zone that are under 10 Earth masses and smaller than 2.5 Earth radii, and thus have a chance of being rocky. Note that inclusion on this list does not guarantee habitability, and in particular the larger planets are unlikely to have a rocky composition. Earth is included for comparison.

Note that mass and radius values prefixed with "~" have not been measured, but are estimated from a mass-radius relationship.

Previous candidates

Some exoplanet candidates detected by radial velocity that were originally thought to be potentially habitable were later found to most likely be artifacts of stellar activity. These include Gliese 581 d & g, Gliese 667 Ce & f, Gliese 682 b & c, Kapteyn b, and Gliese 832 c.

HD 85512 b was initially estimated to be potentially habitable, but updated models for the boundaries of the habitable zone placed the planet interior to the HZ, and it is now considered non-habitable. Kepler-69c has gone through a similar process; though initially estimated to be potentially habitable, it was quickly realized that the planet is more likely to be similar to Venus, and is thus no longer considered habitable. Several other planets, such as Gliese 180 b, also appear to be examples of planets once considered potentially habitable but later found to be interior to the habitable zone.

Similarly, Tau Ceti e and f were initially both considered potentially habitable, but with improved models of the circumstellar habitable zone, as of 2022 PHL does not consider either planet potentially habitable. Kepler-438b was also initially considered potentially habitable; however, it was later found to be a subject of powerful flares that can strip a planet of its atmosphere, so it is now considered non-habitable.

K2-3d and K2-18b were originally considered potentially habitable, and the latter remains listed in the HEC, but recent studies have shown them to be gaseous sub-Neptunes and thus unlikely to be habitable.

KOI-1686.01 was also considered a potentially habitable exoplanet after its detection in 2011, until proven a false positive by NASA in 2015. Several other KOIs, like Kepler-577b and Kepler-1649b, were considered potentially habitable prior to confirmation, but with new data are no longer considered habitable.

See also

References

External links

 "The Habitable Exoplanets Catalog" (PHL/UPR Arecibo)
 Habitable Exoplanets Catalogue ranks alien worlds on suitability for life
 Definition of "goldilocks" connoting "moderate characteristics" and examples referring to planets dating to 1935

 
Potentially habitable exoplanets
exoplanets